Compsothrips is a genus of thrips in the family Phlaeothripidae.

Species
 Compsothrips aeneus
 Compsothrips albosignatus
 Compsothrips baileyi
 Compsothrips bicolor
 Compsothrips brasiliensis
 Compsothrips brunneus
 Compsothrips congoensis
 Compsothrips dampfi
 Compsothrips graminis
 Compsothrips hoodi
 Compsothrips hookeri
 Compsothrips jacksoni
 Compsothrips maroccanus
 Compsothrips oneillae
 Compsothrips pampicolla
 Compsothrips querci
 Compsothrips ramamurthii
 Compsothrips reticulates
 Compsothrips reuteri
 Compsothrips sinensis
 Compsothrips sumatranus
 Compsothrips tenebronus
 Compsothrips timur
 Compsothrips tristis
 Compsothrips uzeli
 Compsothrips walteri
 Compsothrips yosemitae

References

Phlaeothripidae
Thrips
Thrips genera